Craig R. Benson (born October 8, 1954) is an American politician and entrepreneur who served as the 79th Governor of New Hampshire from 2003 to 2005.  Benson first came to public attention when he founded Cabletron Systems, later known as Enterasys Networks, which became one of the largest employers in New Hampshire. Enterasys Networks was acquired by Extreme Networks in November 2013.

Early life and business career 
Benson attended Chatham High School in Chatham, New Jersey. After receiving a bachelor's degree in finance from Babson College in 1977, Benson attended Syracuse University, graduating with an MBA in 1979.

In 1983, Benson and partner Robert Levine started Cabletron Systems in Levine's garage. The company moved to Rochester, New Hampshire in 1985 and went public in 1989, with what was then the largest IPO in Wall Street history. In 1991, Benson was named "Entrepreneur of the Year" by Inc. Magazine.

The company grew to have over $1.8 billion in annual revenue, but over time Cabletron began to face heavy competition in the industry. Benson resigned in 1999, and Cabletron was dissolved into four separate companies (Enterasys Networks, Aprisma Management Technologies, Riverstone Networks, and Global Network Technology Services) in January 2000. The company's fragmentation brought layoffs, declines in stock price, and shareholder lawsuits.

Governor of New Hampshire 
Benson began running for governor of New Hampshire in 2001, promising to use technology and greater efficiency to save money in state government. Political signs appeared across the Granite State proclaiming "This is Benson Country." He was elected governor on November 5, 2002, in an open race to succeed the retiring governor, Jeanne Shaheen. In the primaries, Benson spent more than $15 million—$11 million of it his own money—in an effort to defeat former state Senator Bruce Keough and former U.S. Senator Gordon Humphrey to win the Republican nomination, making Benson's victory one of the most expensive in American history. In the general election, Benson easily defeated Democratic state Senator Mark Fernald, 59 percent to 38 percent. Benson successfully made Fernald's support for a statewide income tax the dominant issue in the race. Benson spent more than $9 million, again mostly his own money, in this race.

As Governor, Benson pushed for state agencies to institute across-the-board budget reductions, and used a custom made, extra large "VETO" stamp to reject a state budget he thought was too large. Benson also signed into law a bill that required parental notification for minors seeking an abortion;  this law was later challenged and upheld in the Supreme Court in the case Ayotte v. Planned Parenthood of New England, but subsequently repealed by the New Hampshire legislature in 2007.

Benson's administration came under criticism following the resignation of Attorney General Peter Heed, who had been accused of sexual harassment. While an investigation cleared Heed of any wrongdoing, it revealed improper interference by Benson's security commissioner.  Further criticism stems from the inappropriate awarding of a nearly $900,000 no-bid contract by his "volunteer" adviser (and former Cabletron human resource administrator) Linda Pepin, who was not licensed to broker such a deal.

Benson also frequently used "volunteers" in his office to do gubernatorial work, but would not say who they were or what they did. These were not volunteers in the sense that they were unpaid staffers volunteering their time, rather Benson paid their salaries out of his own pocket, making them volunteers in the sense that they did not draw state salaries. This move was controversial, while proponents noted that Benson was generously allowing the state to save money, critics were concerned that it would limit scrutiny of the volunteer staff. Reporters discovered that one of these "volunteers" (and former Cabletron director of operations), Angela Blaisdell, was New Hampshire's official liaison with the federal government on homeland security. In addition, Benson was accused of engaging in political payback when Dori Wiggin, supervisor of the Department of Environmental Services Wetlands Division in Portsmouth, was transferred to the department's Concord headquarters. Under Wiggin, the DES had fined Benson in 1998 and 2003 for excavating beach sand without a permit at his Rye oceanfront home.

Benson was also criticized, by both supporters and critics, for a management style that was considered "autocratic". In an interview with The New York Times, Benson stated that one of his first acts after being elected was to purchase a large, high table at which to hold his meetings. Those in attendance were to stand during meetings, and any latecomers were locked out. "It's to remind people we're here to get in and do our business and get out," he explained.

In the 2004 election, Benson lost to Democratic challenger John Lynch—only the second time in 78 years that an incumbent New Hampshire governor was denied a second term—in a very close race, with Lynch securing just 51% of the vote.

Personal life 
Benson resides in Rye, New Hampshire with his wife Denise. They have two daughters.

Benson serves as an adjunct lecturer at Babson College, his alma mater. In 1995, he was inducted into the college's Academy of Distinguished Entrepreneurs.

Merrill Lynch settlement 
In December 2020, Merrill Lynch was ordered by the New Hampshire Bureau of Securities to pay $24 million in restitution to Benson, and an additional $2 million fine to the State of New Hampshire. Benson complained to the Bureau of Securities in early 2019 after suffering losses while the stock market was gaining. Benson also filed a complaint with FINRA which was settled with the Bureau case.

The settlement is the largest in New Hampshire history, and second largest FINRA settlement in a decade.

Electoral history

References

 Steen, Jennifer (2006). Self-financed candidates in congressional elections. University of Michigan Press. .

External links
 2002 campaign website
 

|-

|-

1954 births
Living people
Republican Party governors of New Hampshire
Babson College alumni
Martin J. Whitman School of Management alumni
American businesspeople
Politicians from New York City
Babson College faculty
People from Rye, New Hampshire
Chatham High School (New Jersey) alumni
People from Morris County, New Jersey